SCML can refer to : 
SCML may refer to:

 Scribe (markup language)
 Structural Character Modeling Language, a Chinese character description language proposal
 Santa Casa da Misericórdia de Lisboa (Portugal)
 Safe Consumer Markup Language, a structured business language to enhance communications between suppliers and retailers during food crises